Paul Fischer (born 1881, date of death unknown) was a German athlete and gymnast.  He competed at the 1908 Summer Olympics in London.

In the 100 metres, Fischer did not finish his first round heat. He also participated in the gymnastics all-around competition but his result is unknown.

References

Sources
 
 
 

1881 births
Year of death missing
German male artistic gymnasts
German male sprinters
Olympic athletes of Germany
Olympic gymnasts of Germany
Athletes (track and field) at the 1908 Summer Olympics
Gymnasts at the 1908 Summer Olympics